The Journal of Nonlinear Optical Physics & Materials is a peer-reviewed scientific journal that was established in 1992 and is published by World Scientific. It covers developments in the field of nonlinear interactions of light with matter, guided waves, and solitons, as well as their applications, such as in laser and coherent lightwave amplification, and information processing.

Abstracting and indexing 
The journal is abstracted and indexed in:
 Current Contents/Physical, Chemical & Earth Sciences
 Astrophysics Data System
 Chemical Abstracts Service
 Inspec
 Scopus

References

External links 
 

Publications established in 1992
Optics journals
Materials science journals
World Scientific academic journals
English-language journals
Quarterly journals